John Young (16 June 1916 – 30 October 1996) was a Scottish actor. He is the father of the actor Paul Young.

Career
Young joined the Edinburgh Gateway Company in 1953, playing Tammas Biggar in Graham Moffat's Bunty Pulls the Strings. His film credits include The Wicker Man (1973, as the fishmonger), Monty Python and the Holy Grail (1975, as Frank, the historian, and the "I'm not dead!" man), and Monty Python's Life of Brian (1979, as Matthias). On television, he played Rev Iain McPherson in the Scottish soap opera Take the High Road for a number of years.

Filmography

Further reading
 Elder, Michael (2003), What do You do During the Day?, Eldon Productions,

References

External links

1916 births
1996 deaths
Scottish male film actors
Scottish male television actors
20th-century Scottish male actors